Euryscaphus is a genus of beetles in the family Carabidae, containing the following species:

 Euryscaphus angulatus W. J. MacLeay, 1865
 Euryscaphus atratus Sloane, 1894
 Euryscaphus carbonarius (Laporte, 1867)
 Euryscaphus dilatatus W. J. Macleay, 1865
 Euryscaphus obesus (W. J. Macleay, 1863)
 Euryscaphus subsulcatus Blackburn, 1888
 Euryscaphus waterhousei (W. J. Macleay, 1864)

References

Scaritinae